Idiotland is a surrealistic comic book by Doug Allen and Gary Leib published by Fantagraphics in 1993–1994. It is noticeably more surreal and Dada-esque that Allen's more-famous work, the Steven comic strip and its compilations.

Idiotland was low on plot and high on bizarre characters of unusual anatomy and memorable names, such as Margarita Schnapps and Lavender Sachet, a pair of mean-spirited, middle-aged shopaholics in anthropomorphic animal form, or Milkshake Gravy, a nosy, unattractive, cross-dressing mailman.  It also includes the serialized, three-part story, "Morties," about a small community overtaken by parasitic, mind-controlling fish, called Morties, which bubble up from the brain and burst through the skull. After "Morties" concluded, a new serial began in issue #4, called "Lunch Money." Both stories starred the creators Allen and Leib portrayed as children.

Idiotland was nominated for a 1994 Harvey Award for Best New Series. It ran for seven issues.

References

External links

 

Fantagraphics titles
1993 comics debuts